While Parents Sleep is a 1935 British comedy film directed by Adrian Brunel and starring Jean Gillie, Enid Stamp Taylor and Romilly Lunge. The film is a screen adaptation of a 1932 play of the same name by Anthony Kimmins, which had been a popular success on the West End stage in the West End of London.

Unlike many of Brunel's 1930s quota quickie films, While Parents Sleep has survived and is regarded as an example of his ability to produce a worthwhile film under the most straitened of financial conditions.  The Time Out Film Guide notes: "With a couple of tatty sets and a bunch of unknown actors, he produces a witty, sharply-paced, economical essay on class and manners in inter-war Britain." It was produced by Transatlantic Film Corporation and British & Dominions Film Corporation.

Premise
The film is a farce about the romantic adventures of two young men with women of differing social backgrounds and the revelation of their true worth.

Cast
 Jean Gillie as Bubbles Thompson
 Enid Stamp Taylor as Lady Cattering
 Romilly Lunge as Neville Hammond
 Mackenzie Ward as Jerry Hammond
 Athole Stewart as Colonel Hammond
 Ellis Jeffreys as Mrs. Hammond
 Davy Burnaby as Lord Cattering
 William Hartnell as George
 Wally Patch as Taxi Driver
 Ronald Shiner as the Mechanic

References

External links 
 
 
 

1935 films
1935 comedy films
British black-and-white films
Films directed by Adrian Brunel
British films based on plays
British comedy films
British and Dominions Studios films
Films shot at Imperial Studios, Elstree
Films produced by Paul Soskin
Films with screenplays by John Paddy Carstairs
Films scored by Percival Mackey
1930s English-language films
1930s British films